Minuartia patula, common names pitcher's stitchwort or  lime-barren sandwort, is an annual plant in the family Caryophyllaceae. It is native to sections of the eastern and central United States, primarily the lower Mississippi Valley, the southern Great Plains, and the Tennessee Valley, with additional scattered populations in Georgia, Virginia, Pennsylvania, and the southern Great Lakes region.

Minuartia patula is found on limestone outcrops and in rocky barrens and glades. It very often has numerous stems crossing each other so as to form a clump of many stems. Flowers are white, forming in the spring then quickly wilting.

Minuartia patula is highly variable throughout its range, and multiple varieties have been named, though none of these is widely accepted today.

References

External links
Photo of herbarium specimen at Missouri Botanical Garden, collected in Missouri in 1989

patula
Flora of the United States
Plants described in 1803